is a single-member electoral district for the House of Representatives, the lower house of the National Diet of Japan. It is located in the prefecture (-dō) of Hokkaidō and consists of three wards (-ku) of the prefectural capital, the city (-shi) of Sapporo: Shiroishi, Toyohira, and Kiyota.

The current representative from the district is Hirohisa Takagi of the Liberal Democratic Party.

Before the introduction of the current first-past-the-post/proportional representation parallel electoral system for the House of Representatives in the 1990s, Sapporo city had been part of the SNTV six-member 1st district.

List of representatives

Recent results

References

Constituencies established in 1996
Politics of Hokkaido
History of Hokkaido
Districts of the House of Representatives (Japan)